Hajj Khalil (also Romanized as Ḩājj Khalīl; also known as Ḩājjī Khalīl) is a village in Garmeh-ye Shomali Rural District, Kandovan District, Meyaneh County, East Azerbaijan Province, Iran. At the 2006 census, its population was 126, in 30 families.

References 

Populated places in Meyaneh County